Shahid Beheshti University, originally founded as the Melli University (National University of Iran), is a public research university in Tehran, Iran. The university offers many programs at Bachelor's, Master's and Ph.D. levels.

History
Shahid Behesti University was founded in 1959 by Ali Sheikholislam. The university was planned to be devoted to graduate studies. At its opening, it consisted of two schools: Architecture and Urban Planning, and Banking and Economics, with 174 students. Soon the School of Literature and Foreign Languages began in downtown Tehran. The first graduate academic degree program was the Master's course in the School of Architecture, launched in 1961. In 1962, a new main campus was built in Evin, a suburb in the north of Tehran. Academic offerings expanded as facilities were added. By 1978 several other faculties became active i.e.the faculties of Literature and Human Sciences, Basic Sciences, Law, Earth Sciences, Statistics and Informatics and Education and Psychology.

Under royal auspices, the university library began to acquire important collections in the field of Oriental studies and literary classics in French and German.

In an academic reform in 1986, the medical schools were separated from the main universities and became [Shahid Beheshti University of Medical Sciences] working under the purview of the Iranian Ministry of Health and Medical Education. The first PhD course was offered in the School of Economics in 1991.

Campuses

 Main campus: Located in Evin District, it extends into Velenjak District in northwestern Tehran, on approximately one million square meters.
 Abbaspour College of Engineering and Technology (ex-Power and Water University of Technology) is in Tehranpars, Tehran

Faculties

 Faculty of Electrical Engineering: Department of Telecommunication, Department of Electronics, Department of Systems and Control, Department of Power
 Faculty of Computer Engineering and Science: Department of Software Engineering & Information, Department of Artificial Intelligence and Robotics, Department of Computer Architecture and Networks
 Faculty of Mechanical Engineering and Energy
 Faculty of Architecture & Urban Engineering: Department of Architecture: Department of Landscape Architecture, Department of Construction, Department of Design, Department of Reconstruction, Department of Urban Planning 
 Faculty of Business & Management: Department of Public Management, Department of Business Management, Department of Commercial Management, Department of Financial Management, Department of Industrial Management, Department of Entrepreneurial Management, Institute for Research
 Faculty of Biological Sciences: Department of Biology, Department of Genetics, Department of Marine Biology, Department of Microbiology, Department of Plant Sciences, Department of Zoology
 Faculty of Economics & Political Sciences: Department of Economics, Department of Political Sciences
 Faculty of Energy Sciences & Modern Technologies: Department of Aeronautics, Department of Biotechnology, Department of Energy, Department of Nanotechnology, Department of Cellulose and Paper sciences
 Faculty of Earth Sciences: Department of Geology, Department of Geography, Department of Geophysics
 Faculty of Law: Department of Criminology & Criminal Law, Department of Intellectual Property, Department of International Trade Law, Department of Economic Law, Department of Environmental Law, Department of Human Rights, Department of International Law, Department of Private Law, Department of Public Law
 Faculty of Literature & Human Sciences: Department of Linguistics and Literature, Department of Philosophy, Department of History, Department of Archaeology, Department of Sociology, Institute of Iranology
 Faculty of Mathematical Sciences: Department of Mathematics, Department of Statistics, Department of Computer Sciences
 Faculty of Nuclear Engineering: Department of Applied Radiation, Department of Fuel-Recycling, Department of Radiology (Medical Radiation)
 Faculty of Physical Education & Sport Sciences
 Faculty of Psychology and Education: Department of Psychology, Department of Behavioral Studies & Advising, Department of Educational Sciences
 Faculty of Sciences: Department of Chemistry, Department of Physics
 Faculty of Civil &Water & Environmental Engineering: Department of Water Resources Engineering, Department of Water and Wastewater Engineering, Department of Structural and Geotechnical Engineering, Department of Environmental Engineering, Department of transportation planning

Research centers
 Institute for Cognitive and Brain Sciences (ICBS)
 Automated Software Engineering Research Group
 Center for Environmental Research
 Center for Cyberspace Research
 Secure Communication and Cryptography
Content transfer technology
 Center for Family Research
 Center for Medicinal Plant and Drug Research Institute
 Phytochemistry
 Laser and Plasma Research Institute
 Fiber optics
 Gas Discharge Laboratory headed by Dr. Hamid Ghomi
 LIBS (Laser Induced Breakdown Spectroscopy)
 Magneto-optics
 Non-destructive Testing
 Polymers and Organic Materials Photonics headed by Dr. Mohajerani
 Center for Pharmaceutical Research
Iranian Research Center for the Silk Road (IRCSR)
International Persian Language teaching Center
Institute for Science and Technology Studies

Notable people

Alumni

Politics
 Mir-Hossein Mousavi (BA, MA), Prime Minister of Iran (1981-1989)
 Masoumeh Ebtekar (BSc), Vice President of Iran for Women and Family Affairs (2017-), Vice President of Iran–Head of Department of Environment (1997-2005, 2013–2017), Member of the Islamic City Council of Tehran (2007-2013)
 Farhad Dejpasand (BA, MA), Minister of Finance (2018-)
 Mohsen Sazegara (MA), former government official, political activist
 Abdolali Bazargan (MA), liberal politician, writer and intellectual

Academics
 Mohammad Mehdi Tehranchi (BSc, MSc), president of the Islamic Azad University (2018-), chancellor of the Shahid Behesti University (2012-2017), professor in the Faculty of Physics at Shahid Behesti University (1998-)
 Mahmudreza Aghamiri (BSc), president of the Islamic Azad University–Central Tehran Branch (2018-), professor in the Faculty of Nuclear Engineering at Shahid Behesti University

Art
 Leila Araghian (BA), architect

Faculty

Engineering
 Fereydoon Abbasi (Nuclear Engineering), Member of the 11th Parliament of Iran, head of the Atomic Energy Organization of Iran (2011–2013)
 Majid Shahriari (Nuclear Engineering), nuclear scientist, Iran's envoy in SESAME

Humanities
 Parviz Davoodi (Economy), First Vice President of Iran (2005–2009), head of the Iran's National Elites Foundation (2006–2007)
 Mostafa Mohaghegh Damad (Law), member of the Academy of Sciences of Iran
 Ahmad Khatami (Persian Language and Literature)
 Saeed Laylaz (Economy), economist and journalist
Iraj Etesam (Architecture) is an Iranian contemporary architect, educator, and author, taught from 1960 to 1964.

World rankings

Times Higher Education

2018-2020: 801-1000

2017: 800

2016: 601-800

Asia University Rankings

2019: 201–250

Academic Ranking of World Universities

2019: 901-1000

Based on the ranking system (Kakarry Simonds, QS), Shahid Behesti University was in the fifth grade for 2017 and 2018 after the Sharif universities, science and industry, Amirkabir and Tehran, respectively at the 701 + And 1000-800.
 Category B++
 Article 64.80
 Citation 63.34
 Total documents 30.59
 JIT 54.25
 JCIT 45.11
 Collaboration 45.32
 Total 303.42

See also
 Shahid Beheshti University of Medical Sciences
 Tehran University
 Allameh Tabataba'i University
 Tarbiat Modares University

References

External links

 Official Website

 
Educational institutions established in 1960
1960 establishments in Iran